Elizabeth Young (née Bennett, born 23 October 1982) is an English professional golfer. In 2022, her 14th season on the Ladies European Tour, she secured her maiden victory at the VP Bank Swiss Ladies Open, a month before her 40th birthday.

Early life and amateur career
Young started playing golf at the age of 12 with her older brother James. She attended the University of Iowa and earned a BA in economics.

As an amateur, she represented England and won the 2007 The Spirit International Amateur Golf Championship in Texas together with Naomi Edwards, Gary Boyd and Danny Willett. Her team finished fourth in the 2008 European Ladies' Team Championship in Stenungsund, Sweden. She represented Great Britain & Ireland at the 2008 Curtis Cup at St Andrews.

Individually, she won the 2006 English Women's Open Amateur Stroke Play Championship and won the 2008 English Amateur Order of Merit. In 2008, she also won the Sally Tournament on the Orange Blossom Tour in the United States.

Professional career
Young turned professional 2009 and joined the Ladies European Tour the same year. In her first 13 LET seasons, her best finish was a T4 at the 2013 Allianz Ladies Slovak Open. The same year she made the cut at the Women's British Open.

In 2016, Young competed in the Women's British Open, held at Woburn while being 7-months pregnant. Following the birth of her child, she took maternity leave from the LET and returned to compete in April 2017 at the Lalla Meryem Cup in Morocco.  

In 2022, Young carded a final-round 69 to beat Linn Grant by one stroke and win the VP Bank Swiss Ladies Open, her first title, in her 14th LET season and a month before her 40th birthday.

Rose Ladies Series
In 2020 during the COVID-19 pandemic, Young along with the then head professional Jason MacNiven at her home club Brokenhurst Manor, proposed a tournament in which lady professionals could compete once again under COVID restrictions. This Ladies Open competition was reported by Kate Rowan in the Daily Telegraph and rapidly became a series of 10 tournaments nationwide following the support of Kate and Justin Rose culminating in a series final at the Wentworth Club. The Rose Ladies Series opening event at Brokenhurst Manor was the first professional golf event to take place during the pandemic restrictions and was won by Charley Hull after a playoff with Young.

Personal life
She competed as Liz Bennett until April 2013, when she married Jonathan Young.

Amateur wins
2006 English Women's Open Amateur Stroke Play Championship
2008 Sally Tournament

Source:

Professional wins (1)

Ladies European Tour wins (1)

Results in LPGA majors
Young only competed in the Women's British Open.

CUT = missed the half-way cut

Team appearances
Amateur
Women's Home Internationals (representing Great Britain and Ireland): 2006 (winners), 2007 (winners), 2008
Vagliano Trophy: (representing Great Britain & Ireland): 2007
The Spirit International Amateur Golf Championship (representing England): 2007 (winners)
Curtis Cup (representing Great Britain & Ireland): 2008
European Ladies' Team Championship (representing England): 2008
Espirito Santo Trophy (representing England): 2008

References

External links

English female golfers
Iowa Hawkeyes women's golfers
Ladies European Tour golfers
Sportspeople from Southampton
1982 births
Living people